2M1207, 2M1207A or 2MASSW J12073346–3932539 is a brown dwarf located in the constellation Centaurus; a companion object, 2M1207b, may be the first extrasolar planetary-mass companion to be directly imaged, and is the first discovered orbiting a brown dwarf.

2M1207 was discovered during the course of the 2MASS infrared sky survey: hence the "2M" in its name, followed by its celestial coordinates.  With a fairly early (for a brown dwarf) spectral type of M8, it is very young, and probably a member of the TW Hydrae association.  Its estimated mass is around 25 Jupiter masses. The companion, 2M1207b, is estimated to have a mass of 3–10 Jupiter masses.  Still glowing red hot, it will shrink to a size slightly smaller than Jupiter as it cools over the next few billion years.

An initial photometric estimate for the distance to 2M1207 was 70 parsecs.  In December 2005, American astronomer  reported a more accurate distance (53 ± 6 parsecs) to 2M1207 using the moving cluster method. The new distance gives a fainter luminosity for 2M1207.  Recent trigonometric parallax results have confirmed this moving cluster distance, leading to a distance estimate of 53 ± 1 parsec or 172 ± 3 light years.

Planetary system
Like classical T Tauri stars, many brown dwarfs are surrounded by disks of gas and dust which accrete onto the brown dwarf.  2M1207 was first suspected to have such a disk because of its broad Hα line.  This was later confirmed by ultraviolet spectroscopy.  The existence of a dust disk has also been confirmed by infrared observations.  In general, accretion from disks is known to produce fast-moving jets, perpendicular to the disk, of ejected material.  This has also been observed for 2M1207; an April 2007 paper in the Astrophysical Journal reports that this brown dwarf is spouting jets of material from its poles.  The jets, which extend around 109 kilometers into space, were discovered using the Very Large Telescope (VLT) at the European Southern Observatory.  Material in the jets streams into space at a few kilometers per second.

See also 
 Lists of exoplanets
 Direct imaging of extrasolar planets

References

External links
 Space.com - Astronomers Confident: Planet Beyond Solar System Has Been Photographed
 Space.com article on the discovery
 
 "A Giant Planet Candidate Near a Young Brown Dwarf" (PDF) from the European Southern Observatory.
 "A Moving Cluster Distance to the Exoplanet 2M1207b in the TW Hydrae Association"

 
M-type brown dwarfs
Centaurus (constellation)
TW Hydrae association
Planetary systems with one confirmed planet
J12073346-3932539
Free-floating substellar objects